Ramayan: Sabke Jeevan Ka Aadhar is an Indian television series produced by Sagar Pictures which aired on Zee TV. It is an adaptation of Ramcharitmanas.

Synopsis

Ramayan narrates the tale of Rama, who was the eldest of the four sons of Dasharatha, the King of Ayodhya. Rama is to become the king of Ayodhya upon his father's retirement, but his stepmother, Kaikeyi, under the influence of her maid Manthara, desires that her son, Bharata, become the king instead.

Recalling that Dasharatha had once promised to grant her any two boons that she asked of him, she demands first that Rama should be exiled to the forest for 14 years and second that Bharata should be crowned ruler in his stead. Although heartbroken, Dasharatha is compelled to keep his word. Reluctantly, he asks Rama to leave for the forest. Rama happily accepts the exile and leaves for the forest. Ram reluctantly accepts the company of his wife, Sita, and his younger brother, Lakshmana. When Bharata learns that his mother is responsible for Rama's exile, he follows Rama and begs him to return with him to Ayodhya. However, Rama refuses, bound by his duty to carry out his father's promise. Bharata decides instead to bring back to the palace Rama's paduka and places them on the throne as a gesture that Ram is the true king. Upon Ram's insistence, Bharata rules as his proxy over Ayodhya throughout the 14 year exile.

Rama, Sita, and Lakshmana wander the forests, combating evil wherever they encounter it. They gain the blessings of numerous wise men and sages along the way. Twelve years into the exile, Ravan, the King of Lanka, abducts Sita. In their search of her, Rama and Lakshmana create a friendship with Hanuman, Sugriv, Jamvanta, and their army of apes. When they reach Lanka, Rama battles Ravan and ultimately kills him, signifying triumph of good over evil.

Episodes

Cast
 Rucha Gujarathi as Ahalya, Sage Gautam's wife
 Himanshu Soni as Vishnu, Goddess Lakshmi's consort who reincarnated as Lord Rama
 Gagan Malik as Rama, incarnation of Lord Vishnu
 Neha Sargam as Sita, incarnation of Devi Lakshmi, wife of Rama
 Nishant Kumar as Bharata, Lord Rama's younger brother, Dasharath and Kaikeyi's son
 Neil Bhatt as Lakshmana, Lord Rama's younger brother, Dasharath and Sumitra's elder son 
 Gaurav Roopdas as Shatrughna,  Lord Ram's younger brother, Dasharath and Sumitra's  younger son 
 Pallavi Sapra as Urmila, Sita's sister and wife of Lakshman
 Malhar Pandya as Hanuman, Lord Rama's devotee
 Mahika Sharma as Devi Amba
 Manav Sohal as Vashishta
 Rishabh Shukla as Dasharatha, King of Ayodhya, Ram, Lakshman,Bharat and Shatrughan's father
 Radha Krishna Dutta as Janaka, King of Mithila, father of Sita and Urmila
 Nitika Anand Mukherjee as Sunaina, Sita and Urmila's mother
 Neelima Parandekar as Kaushalya, Lord Rama's mother, King Dasrath's first consort
 Shikha Swaroop as Kaikeyi , King Dasrath's second wife, Bharat's mother
 Anjalie Gupta as Sumitra , King Dasrath's third wife, Lakshman and Shatrughan's mother
 Ajay Pal Singh Andotra as Malyavan
 Divyanka Tripathi Dahiya as Chandradev disguised as Devi Apsara
 Vije Bhatia as Meghnad
 Sachin Tyagi as Ravana 
 Hemant Choudhary as Agasta
 Amit Pachori as Parshurama
 Tarakesh Chauhan as Vishwamitra
 Anand Goradia as Angad
 Sunita Rajwar as Manthara
 Vikas Shrivastav as Nishadraj
 Anup Shukla as Shashiketu
 Sunil Bob Gadhvali as Shukracharya

References

External links
 Ramayan Official Site

2012 Indian television series debuts
Zee TV original programming
Television shows based on poems
2013 Indian television series endings
Television series based on the Ramayana